The Hotel Metlen, located at 5 S. Railroad Ave. in Dillon in Beaverhead County, Montana, was built in 1897 by Joseph C. Metlen. It was listed on the National Register of Historic Places in 1983.

It is prominent in the community. It was built to accommodate travellers and is located by the city's railroad stop — across the right-of-way of the Union Pacific Railroad from the main business district of Dillon. The hotel featured two historic saloons, dance floor, restaurant and a gaming casino.

It is a two-story building made of sandstone bricks and is Second Empire in style.

References

National Register of Historic Places in Beaverhead County, Montana
Second Empire architecture in Montana
Commercial buildings completed in 1897
Hotel buildings on the National Register of Historic Places in Montana
1897 establishments in Montana
Hotels established in 1897
Sandstone buildings in the United States